This is a list of Kent County Cricket Club List A cricket records; that is, record team and individual performances in List A cricket for Kent County Cricket Club. List A cricket is a limited overs form of cricket usually played over one day.

Kent played their first List A match in the 1963 domestic season against Sussex in the 1963 Gillette Cup at the Nevill Ground, Tunbridge Wells. The county have competed in List A competitions in every season since 1963 and, as of February 2018, have played just over 1,000 List A matches, including against representative and touring international sides. In January and February 2017 they competed in the 2016–17 Regional Super50, the List A competition of the West Indies domestic season. This was the first time that any English county had competed in an overseas domestic competition. Kent competed again in the competition in 2018.

The county have won ten domestic List A competitions, most recently the 2001 National League. Long serving spin bowler Derek Underwood holds the record for most List A appearances for Kent with 377 matches played for the county between 1963 and 1987.

Team records 
All records last updated 3 August 2022
 Highest total for: 384/6 vs Berkshire at Finchampstead, 1994 (60 over match) and 384/8 vs Surrey at Beckenham, 2018 (50 over match)
 Highest total against: 405/4 by Durham at Beckenham, 2021 (50 over match)
 Lowest total for: 69 all out vs Somerset at Taunton, 1979
 Lowest total against: 60 all out by Derbyshire at  Canterbury, 2008

Highest partnerships 
The highest partnership for Kent was 241 runs for the 2nd wicket between Trevor Ward and Aravinda de Silva made against Surrey at Canterbury in 1995 in a 40 over match.

Individual batting records 

Over 100 players have scored a century for Kent in List A cricket since the county began competing in this form of cricket in 1963. The first century for Kent was made by Colin Cowdrey against Suffolk in the 1966 Gillette Cup. Chris Tavaré, Robert Key, Martin van Jaarsveld and Joe Denly have all scored eight centuries in their Kent careers.

The highest individual score for Kent is 206 not out made by Ollie Robinson in the 2022 Royal London One-Day Cup against Worcestershire in August 2022 at New Road, Worcester. This is the only double century to be scored by a Kent player in List A matches and surpassed the previous highest score of 150 not out made by Joe Denly in the 2018 Royal London One-Day Cup against Glamorgan in May 2018 at Canterbury. Denly in turn had surpassed the innings of 147 made by Darren Stevens in the previous year's competition and Andrew Symonds' score of 146 in the 2004 National League.

 Highest individual score: 202 not out Ollie Robinson vs Worcestershire at Worcester, 2022 (50 over match)
 Most runs in a season: 1,073 Trevor Ward, 1995
 Most career runs: 7,814 Mark Benson, 1980–1995

Individual bowling records 

Long serving spin bowler Derek Underwood dominates Kent bowling records in List A cricket, leading the county in wickets taken and, with 530 wickets, is the only player with more than 400 wickets for Kent. Underwood also has the best bowling figures in Kent List A history, with Alan Dixon taking the second best figures for the county, and took five wickets in an innings eight times. Three players have taken hat-tricks for Kent in List A cricket, Richard Ellison, Martin McCague and, most recently in 2015, Matt Coles.

 Best bowling: 8/31 Derek Underwood vs Scotland at Myreside, Edinburgh, 1987
 Most wickets in a season: 49, Martin McCague, 1992
 Most career wickets: 530, Derek Underwood, 1963–1987

See also
 List of Kent County Cricket Club first-class cricket records
 List of Kent County Cricket Club Twenty20 cricket records

References

External links
 Kent County Cricket Club website

Lists of English cricket records and statistics
Cricket in Kent
Cricket